Hanna Volodymyrivna Hatsko-Fedusova (born 3 October 1990 in Zaporizhia) is a Ukrainian track and field athlete who competes in the javelin throw. She competed in the javelin throw at the 2012, and 2016 Summer Olympics.

Competition record

References

Sportspeople from Zaporizhzhia
Ukrainian female javelin throwers
1990 births
Living people
Olympic athletes of Ukraine
Athletes (track and field) at the 2012 Summer Olympics
Athletes (track and field) at the 2016 Summer Olympics
World Athletics Championships athletes for Ukraine
Olympic female javelin throwers
Athletes (track and field) at the 2019 European Games
European Games medalists in athletics
European Games gold medalists for Ukraine
Ukrainian Athletics Championships winners